Bedong (pronounced as ) is a small town in Kuala Muda District, Kedah, Malaysia. The Permaipura Golf & Country Club is located in Bedong.

Education
There are a few primary schools in Bedong:
 SK Batu Hampar, school code: KBA3003
 SK Bedong, school code: KBA3008
 SK Ladang Harvard, school code: KBA3009
 SK Seri Aman, school code: KBB3038
 SK Sungai Tok Pawang, school code: KBA3018
 SJK (C) Sin Kuo Min, official Chinese name: 美农新国民学校, school code: KBC3067
 SJK (T) Bedong, school code: KBD3074
 SJK (T) Ladang Harvard I, school code: KBD3075
 SJK (T) Ladang Harvard II, school code: KBD3076
 SJK (T) Ladang Harvard III, school code: KBD3077
 SJK (T) Ladang Sungai Batu, school code: KBD3078
 SJK (T) Ladang Sungai Bongkok, school code: KBD3079
 SJK (T) Ladang Sungai Puntar, school code: KBD3080
 SJK (T) Sungai Tok Pawang, school code: KBD3081

There are two secondary schools in Bedong:
 SMA Sungai Petani, school code KFT3002
 SMK Bedong, school code KEE3052

Residency 

There are many sections of neighbourhood parks (taman) such as Taman Seri Aman, Taman Permaipura, Permaipura Golf & Country Club,
separate villages (kampung) such as Kampung Sungai Tok Pawang, and a few sections of farming-based residency (ladang) such as Ladang Harvard.

Stores and Services 

Most of the areas in Bedong have a few dedicated lot, blocks or areas for stores and services. They include:
 Bedong Post Office
 Convenience store such as 7-Eleven
 Fresh market of Bedong
 Pasar Malam of Bedong
 Petrol stations such as Caltex petrol station
 Police station of Bedong
Hotel such as Harvard Suasana Hotel and Akasia Hotel

Notes

References 

Kuala Muda District
Towns in Kedah